Valerie Higgins (born May 26, 1998) is an American professional basketball player. She was drafted 25th overall in the third round of the 2021 WNBA Draft by the New York Liberty of the Women's National Basketball Association.

Higgins grew up in West Hills, California, where she attended Chaminade College Prep. She was named to the Naismith High School All-America Watch List and was named a Jordan Brand Classic All-American. She participated in USA Basketball's U18 National Team Trials in 2016 and was named to the team for the 2016 FIBA Americas U18 Championship in Chile. 

Higgins started her college career at the University of Southern California. She played one season with the Trojans, starting 15 of the 29 games she appeared in. she averaged 4.4 points, 2.4 rebounds, 1.7 assists and 1.6 steals at USC.

Higgins transferred to the University of the Pacific after her freshman year. After sitting out one year, she played two at Pacific. She totaled 1,375 points, 744 rebounds, and 278 steals and became the first Pacific player ever chosen in the WNBA Draft.

Southern California and Pacific statistics 

Source

References

1998 births
Living people
American women's basketball players
Basketball players from Los Angeles
New York Liberty draft picks
Pacific Tigers women's basketball players
People from West Hills, Los Angeles
USC Trojans women's basketball players